It's Got to Be Funky is an album by jazz pianist Horace Silver, his first release on the Columbia label since Silver's Blue (1956), featuring performances by Silver with Oscar Brashear, Ron Stout, Bob Summers, Bob McChesney, Maurice Spears, Suzette Moriarty, Eddie Harris, Branford Marsalis, Red Holloway, Bob Maize, and Carl Burnett, with vocals by Andy Bey. The Allmusic review by Scott Yanow awarded the album 4 stars and states: "After a 13-year period in which he mostly recorded for his private Silveto label, pianist/composer Horace Silver was rediscovered by Columbia for this session... All of the music (except for a remake of "Song for My Father") was new and served as proof that the master of jazz-funk had not lost his stuff".

Track listing
All compositions and lyrics by Horace Silver
 "Funky Bunky" - 7:31  
 "Dufus Rufus" - 5:34  
 "The Lunceford Legacy" - 7:03  
 "The Hillbilly Bebopper" - 5:28  
 "The Walk Around - Look up and Down Song" - 5:55  
 "It's Got to Be Funky" - 6:45  
 "Basically Blue" - 6:27  
 "Song for My Father" - 8:33  
 "When You're in Love" - 4:30  
 "Put Me in the Basement" - 7:19  
 "Little Mama" - 7:04  
 "Yo' Mama's Mambo" - 3:37  
Recorded in NYC on February 8 & 9, 1993.

Personnel
Horace Silver - piano
Oscar Brashear, Ron Stout, Bob Summers - trumpet, flugelhorn
Bob McChesney - trombone
Maurice Spears - bass trombone
Suzette Moriarty - french horn
Eddie Harris, Branford Marsalis - tenor saxophone
Red Holloway - tenor saxophone alto saxophone  
Bob Maize - bass
Carl Burnett - drums
Andy Bey - vocals

References

Horace Silver albums
1993 albums
Columbia Records albums